Euidotea is a genus of marine isopods belonging to the family Idoteidae. The species of this genus are found in Australia and New Zealand.

Species
There are seven species:
Euidotea bakeri 
Euidotea caeruleotincta 
Euidotea danai 
Euidotea durvillei 
Euidotea halei 
Euidotea peronii 
Euidotea stricta

References

Valvifera
Isopod genera
Taxa named by Walter Collinge